Rewari (Rural) is a census town in Rewari district in the Indian state of Haryana.

Demographics
 India census, Rewari (Rural) had a population of 4453. Males constitute 54% of the population and females 46%. Rewari (Rural) has an average literacy rate of 68%, higher than the national average of 59.5%: male literacy is 77%, and female literacy is 57%. In Rewari (Rural), 14% of the population is under 6 years of age.

References

Cities and towns in Rewari district
Rewari